Toms Creek is a stream in Reynolds County in the U.S. state of Missouri. It is a tributary of the West Fork Black River.

Toms Creek is named for Thomas Sutterfield, an early settler.

See also
List of rivers of Missouri

References

Rivers of Reynolds County, Missouri
Rivers of Missouri